Tipasjärvi, is a medium-sized lake including two lakes (Iso Tipasjärvi and Pieni Tipasjärvi) in the Oulujoki main catchment area. It is located in the region Kainuu. This contains many small islands, including Vuorissaari and Huuskonsaari.

See also
List of lakes in Finland

References

Kainuu
Lakes of Sotkamo